Shrines is the fourth studio album by American hip hop group Armand Hammer. It was released via Backwoodz Studioz in 2020. The album's cover is a photograph of a NYPD police officer about to tranquilize and capture the tiger Ming of Harlem.

Background
Billy Woods and Elucid toured Europe as Armand Hammer in 2019. While in Edinburgh, they started writing a song titled "Bitter Cassava" and made demos. They recorded the song after they got back to New York City. Once a few things were figured out, they started work on Shrines.

Critical reception

Eden Tizard of The Quietus stated that "Shrines sees a new kind of clarity takes shape, a departure from 2018's monolithic Paraffin." He added: "Where production there was thick and volatile like boiled tar, Shrines is comparatively spacious, the density of the bars even more pronounced." Tom Breihan of Stereogum described Shrines as "an album about people trying to build utopias on perilous and unstable piles of garbage." He stated that "Armand Hammer take in the poison-cloud existential joke of a world around them, and they answer that joke with images as poetic as the tiger at the window."

Track listing

References

External links
 
 

2020 albums
Armand Hammer (music group) albums
Albums produced by Earl Sweatshirt
Albums produced by Kenny Segal